Aakarshi Kashyap (born 24 August 2001) is an Indian badminton player. She was selected to be part of the Indian team at the 2018 Asian Games. She was part of the national women's team that won the gold medal in 2019 South Asian Games.

Early life, training and domestic results

Early life and training 
Aakarshi Kashyap was born on 24 August 2001 in Bhilai, Chhattisgarh, to Sanjeev Kashyap, a dermatologist, and Amita Kashyap. She has a younger brother named Shreyash. Aakarshi studied in Delhi Public School, Rajnandgaon. Her father encouraged her to improve her fitness and physical training. She studied for a BA at Seth Sugan Chand Surana College, Durg.

Aakarshi started playing badminton in 2009 under Coach Sanjay Mishra at Ravi Shankar Stadium in Durg. She used to train by herself at the badminton courts of Bhilai Steel Plant, playing with locals three against one.

2014–2016
Kashyap's first win was at the All India Ranking Tournament in Sivakasi on August 24, 2014. She won the nationals title at Vishakhapatnam in November 2015.

On 28 April 2016, Kashyap won the twin crowns in the U-15 and U-17 girls' single category at the PNB MetLife Junior Badminton Championship Season 2 National Finals.

In 2016, Kashyap began training in Prakash Padukone Academy in Bengaluru. She stayed with her mother in an accommodation sponsored by Olympic Gold Quest, a non-profit organization. Kashyap claimed twin crowns in the U-17 and U-19 girls' singles in the 25th Krishna Khaitan Memorial All India Junior Ranking Badminton Tournament organized by Express Shuttle Club on October 16, 2016.

Also in 2016, Kashyap was selected to represent India in the Badminton Asia U-15 and U-17 junior championships, held at Kudus, Indonesia, where she bagged a bronze medal.

2017–2018
In November 2017 Kashyap lost against London Games bronze medallist Saina Nehwal in the senior National Badminton Championship. But this match drew her into the spotlight. In December 2017 she scored a double win at the 42nd Junior National Badminton Championship (U-17, U-19) held in Guwahati.

In January 2018 she won the top prize at the Yonex-Sunrise All India Senior Ranking badminton tournament in Bengaluru. Kashyap was made to fight hard for her win in the final against Gayathri Gopichand, prevailing in the final decider after a 63-minute marathon match 21–17, 12–21, 21–9.

In the Khelo Indian School Games held in January 2018, Kashyap won in the U-17 match. India's ranked player won the girl's singles title of the Yonex sunrise all India junior ranking badminton tournament in May 2018.

2019–present
In 2019, Kashyap continued her form by taking top honours gain in the domestic singles event at the Yonex Sunrise All India Senior Ranking tournament in Vijayawada, India. She defeated Anura Prabhudesai in the final with a 21–12, 21–16 victory.

In 2020, Kashyap began practicing at the Suchitra Badminton Academy in Hyderabad. The ace shuttler from Chhattisgarh won the title in the women's singles category at Kenya International 2020, which is the BWF Future Series event.

In December 2021, Kashyap once again clinched the women's singles titles at the All India Ranking tournament. Kashyap defended her title by defeating qualifier Tanya Hemanth in straight games in the  final 21–15, 21–12. In 2022 she defeated Ashmitia Chaliha in BAI selection trials to qualify for the Uber Cup team and Asian and Commonwealth games in individual and team event.

Achievements

BWF International Challenge/Series (3 titles, 2 runners-up) 
Women's singles

  BWF International Challenge tournament
  BWF International Series tournament
  BWF Future Series tournament

References

External links
 

2001 births
Living people
People from Bhilai
Racket sportspeople from Chhattisgarh
Sportswomen from Chhattisgarh
Indian female badminton players
Badminton players at the 2018 Asian Games
Asian Games competitors for India
Badminton players at the 2022 Commonwealth Games
Commonwealth Games silver medallists for India
Commonwealth Games medallists in badminton
South Asian Games gold medalists for India
South Asian Games medalists in badminton
21st-century Indian women
Medallists at the 2022 Commonwealth Games